"The Musk Who Fell to Earth" is the twelfth episode of the twenty-sixth season of the American animated television series The Simpsons, and the 564th overall episode of the series. It first aired on the Fox network in the United States on January 25, 2015.

Plot
Elon Musk lands with his Dragon 2 spacecraft into the Simpsons' backyard. While eating dinner with them, Musk explains that he is visiting Springfield for inspiration. To this, Homer invites him to tag along with him to the power plant. The next day, during the car ride to the power plant, Musk discovers that Homer has new ideas for inventions, as his "Homerisms" (according to Lisa) quickly inspire him. At the power plant, Musk inspires Mr. Burns to install a magnetohydrodynamic generator to the plant, through a suggestion. Burns attempts to hire him, but Musk rejects the offer as he does not care about the money.

Musk and Burns announce to the town that the power plant has devised new plans for the town's electrical needs (such as Willie spinning a wheel, the Springfield Hyperloop, self-driving vehicles for Springfield and Musk's latest project, the Glayvinator). Despite the town's cheer to this, Smithers remains suspicious about Musk. Bart sneaks into his family's car to disable the auto-drive mode, requiring Musk's master password. He and Lisa go for a joyride in the car, where they land at the power plant, where Musk reveals that the town is currently losing roughly $50 million a quarter, much to Burns' horror. Musk explains to Burns that the true intention was to save the Earth. Angered at Musk's actions, Burns announces to his employees that there will be mass layoffs at the Springfield power plant, and decides to kill Musk. Homer is also horrified because Musk caused Lenny, Carl and many other power plant employees to be fired, but Marge advises him to end his friendship with Musk gently.

The next day, while Musk is discussing his ideas for inventions with Homer, Burns attempts to assassinate him. Though the bullet accidentally aims in Homer's way, Musk saves him. Homer gratefully thanks him, but he admits to Musk that he needs to end their friendship. To this, the two share one last hug and one last Homer-inspiration: he tells Musk that the little dolphin on the helmet of the Miami Dolphins is also wearing a helmet (although this was no longer accurate by the time this episode aired, since the team replaced that logo design before the 2013 season). The Simpson family say goodbye to Musk, as he boards his rocket to space, musing that he will miss Homer's last thoughts to him. To make up for Homer's and Lisa's sadness at his departure, he gives the family a futuristic birdhouse (similar to the birdhouse from the start of the episode).

Production
The episode was written by Neil Campbell, a freelance writer. It guest stars Elon Musk as himself. Executive producer Al Jean stated they tried to make the episode not a "kiss-ass" guest star turn, and the episode contains many jabs at Musk's perceived egotism. Musk was a fan of the series, having watched the show since attending university. He guest starred on the show because he and executive producer James L. Brooks had a meeting, after which Brooks was convinced he wanted a fictional version of Musk on the show. The closing theme is David Bowie's "Starman", later associated with Musk's Falcon Heavy launch in 2018.

Reception
The episode received an audience of 3.29 million, making it the most watched show on Fox that night. Dennis Perkins of The A.V. Club gave the episode a C, saying "‘The Musk Who Fell to Earth’ plays out more like a love letter to Musk than a proper Simpsons episode. It's like some Simpsons writers met Musk at a TED talk, got smitten when they found out Musk was a fan, and turned an episode of the show over to him. Which would be less of a problem if the episode were well-thought-out and funny, Musk were an engaging comic presence, or the Simpsons themselves weren't relegated to supporting status on their own show."

In 2022 The Guardian said the episode was "perhaps the most fawning" of Musk's celebrity media cameos.

In November 2022 Musk claimed in a tweet that the episode correctly predicted his acquisition of Twitter, due to a scene where Lisa Simpson feeds birds that are in a birdhouse in Simpson's backyard with a sign that reads "Home Tweet Home". Though in reality this scene wasn't a direct reference to Twitter and occurs before Musk appears in the episode. Though it was also noted by The Independent that the subplot of Mr. Burns laying off a portion of the Springfield Power Plant's staff due to Musk, is similar to Musk's real life mass Twitter layoffs that occurred soon after his acquisition of the platform.

References

External links 
 
 "The Musk Who Fell to Earth" at theSimpsons.com

2015 American television episodes
The Simpsons (season 26) episodes
Elon Musk